Manasu Mangalyam is a 1971 Telugu-language drama film, produced by Koganti Kutumba Rao under the Uttama Chitra banner and directed by K. Pratyagatma. It stars Akkineni Nageswara Rao, Jamuna  and with music composed by Pendyala Nageswara Rao.

Plot
The film begins with Ravi (Akkineni Nageswara Rao) a poet who suffers from a penniless situation, even unable to pay the house rent for which he hides his face from his house owner Perumalaiah (Ramana Reddy), and the minor source that he has is his best friend Shekar (Rama Krishna). Perumalaiah leads a happy family life with his wife Aandallu (Suryakantham) & son Kavi Kulashekara (Padmanabham) but sadly their only daughter Amurtha (Manimala) elopes. Surprisingly, one night, a beautiful rich woman Manjula (Jamuna) while escaping from the Police lands in Ravi's room, and everyone assumes her as his wife. There onwards, Ravi's life takes a U-turn and they are acquainted with each other. Manjula also publishes his literary work and makes him a famous poet when Ravi starts loving her. After that, Ravi narrates his past, in his childhood, he has been missed by his elder sister Seeta & younger brother Madhu. Right now, Seeta (Anjali Devi) who, unfortunately, grows up at a prostitute's house as Mumtaz rears Madhu (Chandra Mohan) with a lot of affection & care without revealing her identity.

Later Manjula Suddenly disappears, Ravi could not find her whereabouts and becomes a drunkard, in that state, he goes0 to Mehdi where Mumtaz recognizes him but maintains silence. Thereafter, Manjula returns to her house where shockingly, it is revealed that she is already married to a person Murthy (Jaggayya). Meanwhile, Kavi Kulashekara felicitates Ravi to which Murthy is invited as chief guest. During that time, Ravi gets surprised to see Manjula as Murthy's wife then he seeks the truth and she replies. She is the granddaughter of a multi-millionaire Parandhamaiah (V. Nagayya), Murthy used to work as their manager who posed himself as a wise person and married her. Soon after the marriage, she learned that he is a deceiver of a poor girl who is none other than Amirtha that's why she has evaded and taken shelter at Ravi's house. Parallelly, Manjula's younger sister Sarala (Anitha) loves Madhu. At present, Manjula decides to unite Murthy & Amurtha through Ravi she finds out Amurtha is under the guardianship of Shekar, so, Manjula takes her home but Murthy refuses to marry her. On the other side, Madhu knows the truth regarding his sister, nevertheless, he understands her virtue but Sarala accuses them when Madhu becomes furious and Murthy provokes his anger. Both of them plan to blast their factory when Ravi obstructs and the combat erupts between the brothers. Now, Mumtaz arrives, reveals their birth secret and Amurtha protects Murthy from harm when he is aware of his mistake. At last, Murthy accepts Amrutha and divorces Manjula even though Madhu & Sarala are paired up. Finally, the movie ends with Ravi continuing his journey and Manjula too accompanying him.

Cast
Akkineni Nageswara Rao as Ravi
Jamuna as Manjula 
Jaggayya as Murthy
V. Nagayya as Purushotham 
Ramana Reddy as Perumallaiah 
Padmanabham as Kavi Kula Shekharam
Ramakrishna as Shekhar 
Chandra Mohan as Madhu 
Anjali Devi as Mumtaz 
Suryakantham as Andallu 
Geetanjali as Geetha
Anitha as Sarala 
Manimala as Amrutha
Jhansi as Suramma

Crew
Art: G. V. Subba Rao 
Choreography: Tangappa, Chinni, Sampath
Dialogues: Acharya Aatreya
Lyrics: Acharya Aatreya, Dasaradhi, Appalachary
Playback: Ghantasala, P. Susheela, S. Janaki, S. P. Balasubrahmanyam, Pithapuram, Swarnalata
Music: Pendyala Nageswara Rao
Story: K. Srinivasa Rao
Editing: P. Srihari Rao
Cinematography: K. S. Rama Krishna Rao
Producer: Koganti Kutumba Rao
Screenplay - Director: K. Pratyagatma
Banner: Uttama Chitra
Release Date: 28 January 1971

Soundtrack

Music composed by Pendyala Nageswara Rao.

References

Indian drama films
1970s Telugu-language films
Films scored by Pendyala Nageswara Rao
Films directed by Kotayya Pratyagatma